= Rock Dam Lake =

Lake in the state of Wisconsin, United States

- Hay Creek Lake
- Location within Wisconsin Location within the United States
- Location: Clark County, Wisconsin
- Coordinates: 44°44′01″N 090°50′48″W
- Basin countries: United States
- Surface area: 118-acre (0.48 km^{2})
- Max. depth: 10 feet (3.0 m)
- Surface elevation: 997 feet (304 m)

Rock Dam Lake is an 118-acre (0.48 km^{2}) lake located in Clark County, Wisconsin. The lake is shallow, with the deepest depth at 10 feet. It is rich in iron resulting in a dark red-blue hue.

== Activities ==
Across the street from the lake is the main Rock Dam camping ground. Various homes and cabins are often available for rent year round. Summer activities include camping, swimming, water skiing, jet skiing, and off-road vehicle trails (four-wheelers, dirt bikes). Winter activities include ice fishing and snowmobiling.

== Sources ==
- "Rock Dam Lake (Hay Lake, Hay Creek Lake) Map - Clark County, Wisconsin - WDNR". dnr.wi.gov. Wisconsin DNR
- "Lake List Results". www.uwsp.edu. UW Stevens Point
- "Rock Dam Lake". Geographic Names Information System. United States Geological Survey, United States Department of the Interior.
